Anastasius was a Christian convert who suffered martyrdom with Anthony, Julian, Celsus and Marcionilla, during the Diocletianic Persecution. He is supposed to have converted after being raised from the dead by Saint Julian of Antioch. His memorial is on 9 January. Anastasius is one of the 140 Colonnade saints which adorn St. Peter's Square. His relics are interred at the Ravanica Monastery in Serbia.

References

302 deaths
Converts to Christianity from pagan religions
4th-century Christian martyrs
4th-century Romans
Year of birth unknown
4th-century Christian saints
Christians martyred during the reign of Diocletian